Kabalagala is a neighbourhood in Kampala, the capital and largest city in Uganda. It houses some of the leading partygoers in the city. It is located next to Nsambya where the American Embassy in Uganda is found.

Location
Kabalagala is bordered by Kibuli to the northwest, Namuwongo to the northeast, Muyenga to the east and southeast, Kansanga to the south, Lukuli to the southwest and Nsambya to the west. The coordinates of the neighborhood are:0° 17' 53.00"N, 32° 36' 2.00"E (Latitude:0.298056; Longitude:32.600556).

Overview
Kabalagala is a fast-growing neighborhood in Kampala, Uganda's capital, and largest city. The neighborhood is famous for its many restaurants, bars and nightclubs. It is a major entertainment center, with many of the establishments open 24 hours, 7 days a week. During the 2000s the neighborhood has become a vibrant business hub, with new commercial banks, supermarkets, fuel stations  and a university campus. The neighborhood is a favorite hangout for foreigners visiting or resident in Uganda.

History
The name Kabalagala is derived from the Luganda name of a pancake made from sweet bananas, cassava flour and is spiced with local peppers. Street vendors of this food delicacy would yell "Kabalagala" to motorists waiting to turn at the junction. The name stuck. Prior to that, the neighborhood was known as "Kisugu". That name is now reserved for the more affluent residential area further north and east of Kabalagala.

Points of interest
The following points of interest lie in Kabalagala, or close to the edges of the neighborhood:
 The confluence of (a) Ggaba Road (b) Nsambya Road and (c) Muyenga Road
 The American Embassy in Uganda lies to the west of the neighborhood in another suburb called Nsambya
 The main campus of Kampala International University lies at the border between Kabalagala and neighboring Kansanga
 The Ethiopian Village, a restaurant, bar and nightclub – one of the locations bombed by Somali terrorists on 11 July 2010.
 For accommodation Hotel Kenrock
 A branch of Cairo International Bank
 A branch of DFCU Bank
 A branch of Equity Bank Uganda
 A branch of Orient Bank
 A branch of Tropical Bank
 A branch of Diamond Trust Bank
 A branch of Stanbic Bank
 A branch of Dahabshiil, the international money transfer and exchange company.
 Sosolya Undugu Family Academy and Sosolya Undugu Dance Academy, based here since 1990; Ivan Byekwaso, Lukenge Yusuf, Ssemaganda Ronald, Kudra Rashid, Madina Nalwanga and mutazindwa Sharifu have all been trained here

See also

References

External links
  The Many Faces of Prostitution In Uganda

Neighborhoods of Kampala
Makindye Division